Dinky Doodle was a cartoon character created by Walter Lantz for Bray Productions in 1924.

Description
Dinky was a standard boy character, sporting a flat cap, a striped shirt, and dark shorts. He and his dog Weakheart appeared alongside Lantz himself (as the cartoonist) in a series of cartoons that combined live-action and animation, similar in style to Max Fleischer's Out of the Inkwell series. "Weakheart" was based on the 1920s canine film star Strongheart.

The character enjoyed a degree of popularity among audiences, but was retired from the screen in 1926.

In popular culture
The character was mentioned as someone supposedly kidnapped when Angelo mocks Eddie Valiant for working for a toon in the 1988 film Who Framed Roger Rabbit.

References

External links

Dinky Doodle and Weakheart at Don Markstein's Toonopedia. Archived from the original on September 9, 2015.
The Walter Lantz Cartune Encyclopedia: Miscellaneous Cartunes

Doodle, Dinky
Animated film series
Doodle, Dinky
Film series introduced in 1924
Films with live action and animation
Bray Productions film series
Doodle, Dinky